Lukanin (masculine) or Lukanina (feminine) is a Russian surname. Notable people with the surname include:

Adelaida Lukanina (1843–1908), Russian physician and chemist
Igor Lukanin (born 1976), Azerbaijani ice dancer
Ninel Lukanina, Russian Soviet volleyball player

Russian-language surnames